Park City is a small city located in the Warren and Waukegan townships of Lake County, Illinois, United States, on the northern end of the Chicago metropolitan area. Per the 2020 census, the population was 7,885.

History
Park City was incorporated in 1958 through the approval of a referendum by Park City residents. The incorporation was spearheaded by the owners of four trailer parks in the community who wanted to avoid annexation by the neighboring city of Waukegan. In the late 1970s, a federal lawsuit was filed against Park City, alleging that the city was engaging in housing discrimination against non-whites.  Since that time, the City has become a multi-cultural community, accepting a wide diversity of people from different backgrounds and ethnicities.

Of the city's residential uses, two-thirds are manufactured residential housing and apartments, and one third is single-family housing. The city is split into residential, commercial and industrial zones.  Park City sponsors a Chamber of Commerce to promote its growing business base.

Geography
Park City is located at  (42.351668, -87.888437).

Major streets
  Skokie Highway
  Belvidere Road
 Greenleaf Avenue
 Washington Street
 Old Skokie Road

Demographics

2020 census

Note: the US Census treats Hispanic/Latino as an ethnic category. This table excludes Latinos from the racial categories and assigns them to a separate category. Hispanics/Latinos can be of any race.

2010 Census
As of the 2010 United States Census, there were 7,570 people living in the city. The racial makeup of the city was 45.5% White, 7.4% Black or African American, 5.4% Asian, 1.0% Native American, 0.1% Pacific Islander and 3.9% of two or more races. 65.2% were Hispanic or Latino (of any race).

As of the census of 2000, there were 6,637 people, 2,600 households, and 1,578 families living in the city. The racial makeup of the city was 60.39% White, 7.53% African American, 0.23% Native American, 8.83% Asian, 0.15% Pacific Islander, 17.31% from other races, and 5.56% from two or more races. Hispanic or Latino of any race were 37.76% of the population.

There were 2,600 households, out of which 36.2% had children under the age of 18 living with them, 43.0% were married couples living together, 12.3% had a female householder with no husband present, and 39.3% were non-families. 32.7% of all households were made up of individuals, and 7.2% had someone living alone who was 65 years of age or older. The average household size was 2.55 and the average family size was 3.31.

In the city, the population was spread out, with 27.9% under the age of 18, 11.5% from 18 to 24, 36.8% from 25 to 44, 16.7% from 45 to 64, and 7.1% who were 65 years of age or older. The median age was 30 years. For every 100 females, there were 103.3 males. For every 100 females age 18 and over, there were 103.4 males.

The median income for a household in the city was $36,508, and the median income for a family was $42,387. Males had a median income of $30,767 versus $26,089 for females. The per capita income for the city was $18,595. About 6.1% of families and 8.0% of the population were below the poverty line, including 9.8% of those under age 18 and 7.2% of those age 65 or over.

A diversity of housing exists within the city including single and multi-family housing as well as various mobile home parks. The 2000 median house value was $139,000 and the median rent cost was $679.

Park City is served by the Warren-Newport Public Library District.

Government 
Park city is divided into three wards, with two aldermen representing each ward. City government consists of six aldermen, a city clerk, a city treasurer, and a mayor.  Each are elected to four year terms.  Zoning matters are reviewed by a combined Zoning Board of Appeals/Plan Commission.

The city is served by a full-time police department, a parks and recreation department, public works department, and building department.  The city maintains a full-time teen center in cooperation with Warren Township, its own park system and bike trails.

The Mayor and Park City have developed a new plan to redevelop Greenleaf Street to serve as the focal point of the city. The first phase of the plan involves the installation of new sidewalks, decorative streetlights, and flowering trees and vegetation along Greenleaf Street. The second phase involves the development and implementation of architectural standards for office building development for properties along Greenleaf Street, to include landscape standards, parking lot light standards, architectural design standards, and decorative sign standards. The third phase involves developing incentives and encouraging development along the Greenleaf Street corridor in compliance with the architectural standards.

The first phase was accomplished, and streetlights and sidewalks were installed, the lights were turned on and the sidewalks were open to the public in a ceremony that took place on November 8, 2012.  The second phase was accomplished through the adoption of the Greenleaf Street Overlay Zoning District on May 21, 2009, which provides the development standards for construction on Greenleaf Street, and phase three started with the completed construction of the Lake County Branch Court Complex on Greenleaf Street.  Phase three is not yet completed, and there are properties yet to be developed on the corridor.

Park City has an aggressive policy on traffic enforcement, and the police department is one of the top agencies in the issuance of traffic citations, including DUI enforcement.

References

Cities in Illinois
Cities in Lake County, Illinois
Populated places established in 1958
1958 establishments in Illinois
Majority-minority cities and towns in Lake County, Illinois